The Chorus: Success, Here I Go is a Brazilian musical drama television series created by Miguel Falabella. The series is produced by the companies Nonstop and Formata Produções e Conteúdo on behalf of The Walt Disney Company. In Brazil, the series premiered on Disney+ on September 28, 2022.

Plot  
Young adults from a wide variety of backgrounds answer the audition call for a place in a renowned musical theater company in Brazil. They see it as a chance to rekindle their dreams, which have long since faded into the background, and to set new goals for themselves as they pursue a career in musical theater. Encouraged by mastering the first major hurdle, the aspiring singers and actors go through a colorful roller coaster of emotions in which not only their fascination with the multifaceted world of musical theater is strengthened, but they are also confronted with various forms of love, the ghosts of their past, betrayal and the fear of failure. Because one thing is certain: from one day to the next, both their dreams and their future opportunities can vanish into thin air if they don't get ahead.

Cast 
 Miguel Falabella as Renato Milva
 Gabriella Di Grecco as Nora Labbra
 Sara Sarres as Marita Bell
 Karin Hils as Marion de Almeida
 Lucas Wickhaus as Jorge
 Daniel Rangel as Leandro
 Micaela Díaz as Alícia Peralta
 Gabriel Hipólito as Reginaldo
 Graciely Junqueira as Ivone
 Carolina Amaral as Antonia
 Rhener Freitas as Maurício Sombah
 Bruno Boer as Sissy
 Guilherme Magon as Artur
 Magno Bandarz as Fernando
 Adriano Fanti as Norman

Episodes

References

External links 
 
 

Television shows filmed in Brazil
2020s Brazilian television series
Portuguese-language television shows
Disney+ original programming